Marc Frons is the former chief technology officer of News Corp. He was named to the role in May 2017 after serving in an interim capacity since October 2016. Prior to that, he was SVP, deputy head of technology, and global head of mobile platform at the company. Frons was previously chief information officer of The New York Times and former head of both NYTimes.com Digital Technology and The Timess corporate systems and technology. From July 2006 to March 2012, Frons served as the chief technology officer of the New York Times. Since 2006, he has overseen technology and product development at NYTimes.com while continuing to be involved in broader digital strategy initiatives at the company. Before he joined The Times, Frons was the chief technology officer for The Wall Street Journal Online and other Dow Jones consumer Web sites. He is credited for the development of  Map of the Market, an innovative financial data visualization interface for smartmoney.com and more recently the latest advancements in the customization algorithms that introduce readers to content based on their archived readings as well as the influx of interactivity within a media-rich foundation of NYTimes.com.

Education and early-mid career 
Frons started his career as a journalist while he pursued a B.A. degree in psychology from the City University of New York, Brooklyn College in 1977, where he was campus correspondent for The New York Times. Upon graduation, he went on to be a stringer for The Times when he worked for a few months at a small paper in Rock Springs, Wyoming. He began his career at Newsweek in 1979, going on to hold a variety of senior editor positions at Business Week from 1984 until 1995. It was then that he started one of the first financial Websites (SmartMoney.com), where he held the unusual title of editor and chief technology officer.

Smartmoney.com
From 1995 to early 2002, Frons was editor and chief technology officer of SmartMoney.com, one of the first financial periodical websites. In 1998, they launched The Map of The Market designed by Martin M. Wattenberg. 
The Map used a variant of the "treemap" technique pioneered by Ben Shneiderman. The screen is divided into rectangular tiles that represent publicly traded companies. The area of a rectangle corresponds to the market capitalization of the company, and the color tells you how the stock price has changed since the previous market close. Unlike a traditional treemap, however, the Map of the Market introduced a new algorithm designed to create tiles that were close to square, making for a display that is more legible and easier to interact with. (It turns out that several others, including Jarke van Wijk, independently invented similar algorithms around the same time.)

The Map of the Market quickly became one of the most trafficked sections of the site and spawned many imitators. Today treemaps are a standard tool for visualizing financial data. This break-through data-visualization technology was a huge success and now is commonly seen as a way to view the performance of stocks, asset classes, sectors, or an entire country's stock market relative to its peers. 
Smartmoney.com went on to win three awards in design innovation:

American Society of Magazine Editors (ASME) National Magazine Award for Best Interactive Design in 2001
Online News Association Award in 2000 for Best Interactive Design
Web Marketing Association Award for Best Investing Web Site in 1999

Dow Jones and AOL Time Warner
Frons worked at Dow Jones & Company from 2003 until 2006 as vice president and chief technology officer for its Consumer Media Group, responsible for online product development and applications.  Before that, he worked at AOL Time Warner from January 2002 to June 2003, first as vice president and general manager of AOL Personal Finance and then as consulting editor for CNN Money.

NYTimes.com
Frons was an integral part of the launch of Times Extra an alternative view of the home page featuring news headlines with links from third-party sources. Times Extra aggregates headlines from other news organizations and blogs across the Web, and matches the most relevant of those sources with lead articles on the NYTimes.com home page.

He helped to develop an innovative social and algorithmic recommendation framework that serves up recommended stories based upon the kinds of articles visitors have read, in hopes of "a more passive personalization...that exposes users to content they mat not have seen otherwise."

After completing the more personalized, engagement-oriented user experience, Frons oversaw the transition of adopting the paywall, and prefers to take an unbiased view on the matter. "Paywall or no paywall, our job, and the job of other news organizations, is to provide relevant news and information for our readers. To me, no matter what the model, the more people who read and are engaged with your website or your digital products, the better. So the recommendation engine just fits into our overall strategy of increasing user engagement.”

Family and personal life
Frons lives in Wainscott, New York, and New York City with his wife, psychotherapist Merry Frons, and his dog, a vizsla named Jasper. He has two grown daughters working in the internet and social media field and is a cousin of Brian Frons, former president of ABC Daytime.

See also 
Citizen Journalism
Democratic Journalism
Independent Media Center
Interactive journalism
Media democracy
New Media

References

External links 

Innovation in Media: When Global Meets Digital
Marc Frons talks New York Times and Apple iPad plus the introduction of paid news content.
"You Are What You Read" Nieman Lab 
Interview with Marc Frons
NYT CTO:Kindle Version Gaining 'Some' Traction; Taking Advantage of Mobile's Unique Aspects
Will The Tablet Cure Newspapers' Ills?
Keep Spreading The News
Video Interview with Marc Frons with Stephen Hutcheon
New York Times debuts aggregation homepage

People from Brooklyn
American chief technology officers
Brooklyn College alumni
Living people
Chief information officers
Year of birth missing (living people)